Oxycera leonina, the twin-spotted major, is a European species of soldier fly.

Description
Adult body length 5.5 to 8 mm. Wing length 5.5 to 6 mm. In both male and female, the scutellum has two spines. The abdomen is nearly all black except for small bits of yellow at the tip and the base.

Distribution
Austria, Belgium, Czech Republic, Denmark, France, Germany, Hungary, Italy, Netherlands, Poland, Romania, Russia, Slovakia, Spain, Switzerland, Ukraine, Yugoslavia.

More recently it has also been found in Turkey too.

References

Stratiomyidae
Diptera of Europe
Insects described in 1798